Agnew Walter Giles Giffard  was an Anglican priest in  the first half of the 20th century.

Born in Guernsey on 28 April 1869, he was educated at Elizabeth College, Guernsey and The Queen's College, Oxford and ordained in 1895.   After a curacy in Aylesford he held incumbencies at Manton, Messingham with East Butterwick and Sparsholt with Kingston Lisle.

In 1931 he became  Dean of Guernsey,  a post he held until  his death in 1947.

References

1869 births
People educated at Elizabeth College, Guernsey
Alumni of The Queen's College, Oxford
Guernsey Anglicans
Church of England deans
Deans of Guernsey
1947 deaths